Malaspina is a 1947 Italian melodrama film directed by Armando Fizzarotti and starring Vera Rol, Aldo Bufi Landi and Rino Genovese. It is a melodrama, based on a popular song of the same name. Its story of female wrongdoing and ultimate redemption was characteristic of Neapolitan-style cinema. A young woman promises to be faithful to her lover when he goes off to fight in the Second World War. However, in his absence she becomes a prostitute and takes up with a notorious criminal. When her real love returns he kills her new boyfriend. Deeply ashamed of her conduct, she becomes a nun.

The film revived the Naples film-industry, which had largely disappeared during the Fascist era when Italian filmmaking was concentrated in Rome. The film was released in the United States, where it proved popular with Italian-American audiences.

Cast
 Vera Rol as Maria, detta 'Malaspina'  
 Aldo Bufi Landi as Andrea  
 Rino Genovese as Gaetano 
 Ugo D'Alessio as Nicola  
 Vittoria Crispo as Teresina  
 Carmelo Capurro    
 Nicola Pouthod
 Alberto Amato  
 Gino Vittorio

References

Bibliography 
 Marlow-Mann, Alex. The New Neapolitan Cinema. Edinburgh University Press, 2011.
 Moine, Raphaëlle.  Cinema Genre. John Wiley & Sons, 2009.

External links 
 
 Malaspina at Variety Distribution

1947 films
Italian drama films
Italian black-and-white films
1947 drama films
1940s Italian-language films
Films directed by Armando Fizzarotti
Films set in Naples
Melodrama films
1940s Italian films